A list of personal secretaries.

 Elizabeth Nel, personal secretary to Winston Churchill
 Evelyn Lincoln
 Henry Ponsonby, private secretary to Queen Victoria
 John Hay, private secretary to Abraham Lincoln
 Rochus Misch
 Rose Mary Woods, Richard Nixon's secretary

References

Secretaries